This is a list of the 6 observers to the European Parliament for Cyprus in the 1999 to 2004 session. They were appointed by the Cypriot Parliament as observers from 1 May 2003 until the accession of Cyprus to the EU on 1 May 2004.

List

References

2004
List
Cyprus
Cyprus